Aghkilisa, Aghk’ilisa, Agkilisa, Akhkilisa, or Aghkilisa may refer to:
Aghkilisa, Ararat, Armenia
Azat, Armenia
Chermakavan, Armenia
Krashen, Armenia
Ağkilsə, Azerbaijan